Roy Charles Clayton (born 18 February 1950) is an English former professional footballer who played as a forward. He began his career with Warley County Borough before making 53 appearances in the Football League for Oxford United. Moving back into non-league football, he spent eight years with Kettering Town, finishing as their all-time top scorer, and also played for Barnet, Nuneaton Borough, Corby Town and VS Rugby.

Life and career
Roy Charles Clayton was born on 18 February 1950 in Dudley, Worcestershire. He played football for West Midlands (Regional) League club Warley County Borough before turning professional with Oxford United of the Football League Second Division in August 1969. He made his Football League debut on 20 December, in a 2–0 defeat away to Watford, and had a run of games in the side towards the end of the season during which he scored his first goal at Football League level, albeit in a 5–1 defeat, at home to Sheffield United. Clayton played about half of Oxford's matches over the next two seasons but scored little. His last goal, on 6 September 1972, gave Oxford a 2–1 lead against Manchester United in the League Cup second round, but Bobby Charlton equalised. Clayton was dropped from the team for the replay and promptly submitted a transfer request.

In November 1972, Oxford accepted an £8,000 offer from Kettering Towna Southern League record fee paidand Clayton moved into non-League football. On his second appearance, he opened the scoring in the FA Cup tie away to Football League club Walsall, and scored Kettering's third as they came back from 3–1 down to draw 3–3. He continued to play and to score freely for the next eight years, finishing his Kettering career as the club's all-time record goalscorer with 187 in all competitions, a record that still stands, and he remains in the top five of the all-time appearance charts. In 1979, he helped the team reach the FA Trophy final, in which Kettering lost to Stafford Rangers.

Clayton joined Alliance Premier League club Barnet on loan in August and signed a permanent contract in early October. The players helped raise the £4,000 fee. He stayed for one season, during which he scored four goals from 28 league appearances, and then joined Nuneaton Borough, newly relegated to the Southern League Midland Division. He contributed eight goals from 25 league matches as Nuneaton returned to the Alliance Premuer League at the end of the season, but his last game was in March 1982. With the club about to sign former Coventry City striker Don Nardiello, manager Graham Carr thought Clayton would play little, so he moved on to divisional rivals Corby Town. He finished off his career with a brief spell at VS Rugby of the Southern League Midland Division in 1986.

Notes

References

Sources
 
 

1950 births
Living people
Sportspeople from Dudley
English footballers
Association football forwards
Warley County Borough F.C. players
Oxford United F.C. players
Kettering Town F.C. players
Barnet F.C. players
Nuneaton Borough F.C. players
Corby Town F.C. players
Rugby Town F.C. players
English Football League players
Southern Football League players
National League (English football) players